Nestor Edvard August Östergren (26 February 1890 – 28 October 1970) was a Swedish rower. He competed in the men's coxed four event at the 1920 Summer Olympics.

References

External links
 

1890 births
1970 deaths
Swedish male rowers
Olympic rowers of Sweden
Rowers at the 1920 Summer Olympics
Sportspeople from Stockholm